Nikita Alexandrovich Nekrasov (born 10 April 1973) is a mathematical and theoretical physicist at the Simons Center for Geometry and Physics and C.N.Yang Institute for Theoretical Physics at Stony Brook University in New York, and a Professor of the Russian Academy of Sciences.

Career 
Nekrasov studied at the Moscow State 57th School in 1986–1989. He graduated with honors from the Moscow Institute of Physics and Technology in 1995, and joined the theory division of the Institute for Theoretical and Experimental Physics. In parallel, in 1994–1996 Nekrasov did his graduate work at Princeton University, under the supervision of David Gross. His Ph.D. thesis on Four Dimensional Holomorphic Theories was defended in 1996. 
   
He joined Harvard Society of Fellows at Harvard University as a Junior Fellow 1996–1999.
He was then a Robert. H. Dicke Fellow at Princeton University from 1999 to 2000. In 2000 he moved to France as a permanent professor at the Institut des Hautes Études Scientifiques. Since 2013, he is a full professor at the Simons Center for Geometry and Physics and C. N. Yang Institute for Theoretical Physics  at Stony Brook University in New York.

Research
Nekrasov is mostly known for his work on supersymmetric gauge theory, quantum integrability, and string theory. The Nekrasov partition function, which he introduced in his 2002 paper, relates in an intricate way the instantons in gauge theory, integrable systems, and representation theory of infinite-dimensional algebras.

Honours and awards 

For his contributions to topological string theory and the ADHM construction he received the Hermann Weyl Prize in 2004. In 2008 together with Davesh Maulik, Andrei Okounkov and Rahul Pandharipande he formulated a set of conjectures relating Gromov–Witten theory and Donaldson–Thomas theory, for which the four authors were awarded the Compositio Prize in 2009.

In late 2022, it was announced that Nekrasov was awarded the 2023 Dannie Heineman Prize for Mathematical Physics by the American Institute of Physics (AIP) and the American Physical Society (APS). The prize was awarded for Nekrasov's “elegant application of powerful mathematical techniques to extract exact results for quantum field theories, as well as shedding light on integrable systems and non-commutative geometry.”

References

Living people
1973 births
Russian string theorists
French physicists
Jewish physicists
Mathematical physicists
Princeton University alumni
Theoretical physicists
Moscow Institute of Physics and Technology alumni
Stony Brook University faculty